Chalicosis is a form of pneumoconiosis affecting the lungs or bronchioles, found chiefly among stonecutters. 

The disease is caused by the inhalation of fine particles of stone. The term is from Greek, χάλιξ, gravel.

References

External links 

Lung disorders
Occupational diseases